Patrick Cassidy Finn (born July 31, 1965) is an American film and television actor.

Early life and career
Finn, one of six children, was born in Evanston, Illinois, and grew up in Wilmette, where he attended Loyola Academy High School. He graduated from Marquette University in 1987. During his time at Marquette, he was on the rugby team and was teammates with comedian Chris Farley. After graduation, he moved to Chicago where he worked as a beer salesman until joining The Second City National Touring Company. 

During this time, he was also performing improvisation with the ImprovOlympic in Chicago. After writing and performing in two Second City resident shows, Finn landed the part of George Wendt's younger brother in The George Wendt Show. Pat has also had recurring roles on Murphy Brown, 3rd Rock from the Sun and Ed. His other television credits include series such as Friends, Seinfeld, The Drew Carey Show, That '70s Show, According to Jim, Less than Perfect, The King of Queens, Curb Your Enthusiasm Two Broke Girls and Las Vegas. His film roles include How High, The Bachelor, Dude, Where's My Car?, I Love You, Beth Cooper, Space Buddies and It's Complicated.

He experienced commercial success with campaigns for Got Milk?, PlayStation, DiGiorno Pizza, Holiday Inn, H&R Block, BellSouth, Toyota and others. Finn played the recurring character Bill Norwood on ABC's The Middle starting in 2010. He starred in Marvin Marvin on Nickelodeon from November 24, 2012, to April 27, 2013. He currently lives in Los Angeles with his wife and three children.

Filmography

References

External links

1965 births
Living people
20th-century American male actors
21st-century American male actors
American male film actors
American male television actors
Marquette University alumni
Male actors from Evanston, Illinois